Birgitta Lindström (born 14 January 1948) is a Finnish former tennis player. She has also been known by her married name Birgitta Warbach.

Lindström was the girls' singles champion at the 1966 Wimbledon Championships and the first Finn to win a grand slam title. She represented Finland at the 1968 Federation Cup, where she teamed up with elder sister Christina. In the late 1970s she was the women's tennis coach at Syracuse University.

References

External links
 
 
 

1948 births
Living people
Finnish female tennis players
Wimbledon junior champions
Grand Slam (tennis) champions in girls' singles
Syracuse Orange women's tennis coaches
Finnish tennis coaches
20th-century Finnish women
21st-century Finnish women